The Norwegian Union of Military Officers is a trade union in Norway, organized under the national Norwegian Confederation of Trade Unions.

It was founded in 1896, and eventually got the name Norges Befalslag. In 1978 it was merged with Luftforsvarets Befalsforbund to form Norges Befalsforbund; the current name was taken in 1986. It had about 6,500 members in 2005.

Its headquarters are located in Oslo. It publishes the magazine Befalsbladet.

See also
Norwegian Military Officers' Association

References

Official website 

Trade unions in Norway
Norwegian Confederation of Trade Unions
Organisations based in Oslo
Trade unions established in 1896